Coppuck is a surname. Notable people with the surname include:

Frank Coppuck, British motorsport engineer
Gordon Coppuck (born 1936), British motorsport engineer

See also
Coppock (surname)